David B. Dunn (born 1949) is an American diplomat. He was the United States Ambassador to Togo from 2005 to 2008. He also served as United States Ambassador to Zambia from 1999 to 2002.

Biography
Dunn was born in Great Falls, Montana. He is a graduate of Occidental College and holds master's degrees from American University and the National War College. Dunn is married to Maria-Elena Dubourt and has two sons, Tom and Brian.

He joined the Senior Foreign Service in 1978. Early assignments included Jamaica, Tunisia, France, and Washington, D.C.  Since 1988, he has been engaged with Africa, serving in Burundi, Mauritius, Tanzania, Zambia, South Africa, and Togo, and as deputy director and director of the State Department's Office of East African Affairs. He was appointed as Ambassador to Zambia by President Clinton, where he served from 1999 to 2002. From 2002 to 2005 he served as Principal Officer at the Consulate General in Johannesburg, South Africa. After George W. Bush was elected in 2000, Bush nominated Dunn as Ambassador to Togo on September 6, 2005, and he was confirmed by the United States Congress on October 28, 2005. He was superseded by Patricia McMahon Hawkins on August 22, 2008, as the ambassador to Togo. Following Togo, Dunn was assigned as a faculty member at the National War College, where he also served as Deputy Commandant. Shortly after his retirement at the end of 2010, Dunn was directed by President Barack Obama to return to service to perform the duties of the Alternate Representative for Special Political Affairs at the United States Mission to the United Nations in New York, a position he held for seven months. He returned to the same position in 2014, and in 2015 he returned once again as Acting U.S. Representative for Economic and Social Affairs.

He currently resides in Prescott, Arizona with his family, when not working.

See also
United States Ambassador to Togo
United States Ambassador to Zambia

References

Ambassadors of the United States to Togo
Ambassadors of the United States to Zambia
People from Great Falls, Montana
1949 births
Living people
Occidental College alumni
American University alumni
National War College alumni
United States Foreign Service personnel